BR Standard Class 2 may refer to:

 BR Standard Class 2 2-6-0
 BR Standard Class 2 2-6-2T